Avelo Airlines is an ultra low-cost U.S. carrier headquartered in Houston, Texas. It previously operated charter flights as Casino Express Airlines and Xtra Airways, before transitioning to scheduled operations and rebranding as Avelo Airlines on April 8, 2021. The airline's first scheduled flight under the Avelo name was on April 28, 2021, from Hollywood Burbank Airport to Charles M. Schulz–Sonoma County Airport.

History

Casino Express Airlines 

Established on July 20, 1987, as Casino Express Airlines, the air carrier began operations in 1989 using Boeing 737-200 jetliners flying exclusively for the Red Lion Hotel and Casino in Elko, Nevada. Casino Express operated 737 jet service from Elko Regional Airport nonstop to many cities in the US. In 1994, Casino Express was operating scheduled weekend only flights nonstop between Elko (EKO) and Portland, Oregon, (PDX) and Seattle (SEA) with McDonnell Douglas MD-80 jetliners.  Casino Express Airlines also operated one Boeing 737-200 jetliner for the start-up airline Tahoe Air, which provided scheduled passenger air service from the South Lake Tahoe Airport nonstop flights to Los Angeles International Airport in southern California and also nonstop service to San Jose International Airport in northern California.

Xtra Airways 

Casino Express quickly expanded its customer base to include sports teams, government agencies, foreign dignitaries, press corps, other gaming properties, and other types of public and private charters. It changed its name to Xtra Airways on December 8, 2005, to reflect its broader focus.

Xtra Airways changed its aircraft livery in 2015 to an executive jet style, displaying flag blue and red stripes.

In September 2016, it began operating a Boeing 737-800 (registration: N881XA), repainted in a sky-blue and white livery with "Stronger Together" titles, for the Hillary Clinton 2016 presidential campaign. Soon afterward a second aircraft, Boeing 737-400 (N314XA), was also pressed into service for the campaign, painted with a sky blue stripe and "Clinton/Kaine" titles.

Avelo Airlines 

Andrew Levy, a former chief financial officer (CFO) for United Continental Holdings and a former COO, Chief Operations Officer of Allegiant Air, acquired Xtra in August 2018, with the intent of transforming the charter airline into a scheduled ultra low-cost airline. Xtra had sold most of its fleet to Swift Air, but kept one Boeing 737-400 to retain its FAA Part 121 Regularly Scheduled Air Carrier certification. By April 2019, the airline was considering operating Boeing 737-800s due to the Boeing 737 MAX groundings.

In February 2020, Levy announced the new holding company for Xtra, named Houston Air Holdings, Inc., reflecting the company's Houston headquarters. The same month, the company raised US$125 million in funding and received its first airplane from GE Capital Aviation Services ahead of its original plans to launch scheduled operations later in 2020.

On April 8, 2021, the new airline was announced under the name Avelo Airlines, and began selling tickets for flights based at Hollywood Burbank Airport in California. Its initial route network consisted of eleven unserved destinations from Burbank, launching between April 28 and May 20, 2021, with an initial fleet of three Boeing 737-800s, expanding to six by the end of 2021. Avelo's announcement of its entry into scheduled flight operations was met with competitive response initially from American and Alaska Airlines, with American upgauging the aircraft on its existing route between Phoenix Sky Harbor and Burbank, while Alaska announced a new service between Burbank and Santa Rosa to start on June 1, 2021. Avelo's inaugural flight occurred on April 28, 2021, which traveled from its Burbank base to Santa Rosa's Sonoma County Airport.

Following the airline's launch in late April, Avelo announced on May 6, 2021, that it would open a new base at Tweed New Haven Airport in Connecticut during the third quarter of 2021. The airline additionally announced that it planned to invest US$1.2 million toward the New Haven airport's facilities, and that it would use Boeing 737-700 aircraft for its operations at the new base. The airline on July 7, 2021, announced changes to its network, consisting of its flights to Bozeman and Grand Junction which would terminated by the end of September, while by July 29, 2021, the airline announced an additional five destinations including Fort Collins, Las Vegas, Monterey, Provo, and St. George, although the planned flights to Monterey, Provo, and St. George were later temporarily cancelled. On August 19, 2021, details of the airline's operations at its New Haven base were revealed, initially with four routes between New Haven and destinations in Florida announced to launch during November 2021.  Additional routes were announced during October 2021, including flights between Fort Collins and Las Vegas beginning in December 2021, and flights between New Haven and Sarasota/Bradenton beginning in January 2022.

On January 6, 2022, Avelo announced that it had raised an additional US$42 million. This second-round offering increased Avelo's invested capital base to over US$160 million. On April 14, 2022, the Association of Flight Attendants was certified as the exclusive representative of all of Avelo's 14 flight attendants after a vote under the Railway Labor Act was conducted by the National Mediation Board. On October 20, 2022, the airline announced its fourth base at Wilmington's New Castle Airport in Delaware. On November 10, 2022, Avelo announced the launch of its fifth base at Raleigh–Durham International Airport in North Carolina.

Destinations 

Avelo operates domestic routes on the east and west coast of the United States.
Prior to rebranding as Avelo, the airline operated ad-hoc and on-demand charter services as both Casino Express Airlines and Xtra Airways within the Americas.

Fleet

Current fleet 

, the Avelo Airlines fleet includes the following aircraft:

Former fleet 
Casino Express Airlines and Xtra Airways, Avelo's predecessors, previously operated the following aircraft:

See also 
 List of airlines of the United States

References

External links 

 

Airlines of the United States
Charter airlines of the United States
Airlines based in Texas
Low-cost carriers
Companies based in Houston
Airlines established in 1987